"Do I Love You?" is a 1939 popular song written by Cole Porter, for his musical Du Barry Was a Lady, where it was introduced by Ronald Graham and Ethel Merman.

The song was included in the 1943 film adaptation of the musical, where it was sung by Gene Kelly.

Notable recordings
Leo Reisman & His Orchestra (vocal by Lee Sullivan). This was a popular recording in 1940.
Vera Lynn - recorded on May 8, 1941 with the Jay Wilbur Orchestra. (Decca F 7863) (included in the 2014 compilation National Treasure - The Ultimate Collection).
Ella Fitzgerald - Ella Fitzgerald Sings the Cole Porter Songbook (1956)
Judy Garland - Judy in Love (1958)
Larry Hovis - single (1958)
Peggy Lee - first recorded for Decca Records on April 3, 1956 and later recorded for the Capitol Records album Beauty and the Beat! (1959)
Frankie Vaughan - for the album Warm Feeling (1961)
Aztec Camera - Red Hot + Blue (1990)
Lady Gaga recorded a version of the song for her 2021 collaborative album with Tony Bennett, Love for Sale.

References

Songs written by Cole Porter
Songs from Cole Porter musicals
Ella Fitzgerald songs
1939 songs